Glenn Goluska (1947–2011) was a Canadian book designer and typographer. He was born on June 26, 1947, in Chicago and came to Canada as a student at the University of Toronto. After graduating he worked for some time in the United States before returning to Canada to work at Coach House Press. He left Coach House Press to focus on letterpress printing: his imprints were Imprimerie Dromadaire and Nightshade Press.

Goluska was awarded the Robert R. Reid Award for lifetime achievement or extraordinary contributions to the book arts in Canada by the Alcuin Society in 2011. Goluska had a typeface designed in his honour by Nova Scotia type designer Rod MacDonald.

References

External links 
Glenn Goluska, 1947–2011", Alcuin Society website, 17 August 2011.
Artist/Maker Name "Goluska, Glenn"", Canadian Heritage Information Network.

1947 births
2011 deaths
Canadian typographers and type designers
People from Chicago
American emigrants to Canada
University of Toronto alumni